FK AS Trenčín is a professional football club based in Trenčín, Slovakia, which plays in the Slovak First League. This chronological list comprises all those who have held the position of manager of the first team of AS Trenčín from 1992.

The first manager of AS Trenčín was Slovak Ladislav Kuna.

List of AS Trenčín managers

  Ladislav Kuna (1995–96)
  Stanislav Griga (July 1, 1996–June 30, 1998)
  Róbert Paldan (1998–00)
  Alexander Bokij (2000–01)
  Milan Albrecht (2001)
  Anton Dragúň (2001), (2003)
  Jaroslav Jurkovič (2003)
  Karol Kisel st. (2003–04)
  Anton Jánoš (2004–05)
  Ladislav Hudec (July 1, 2005–March 11, 2006)
  Karol Marko (2005)
  Vlastimil Palička (2006–07)
  Rob McDonald (2007–08)
  Martin Stano (2008)
  Ivan Galád (2008–09)
  Vladimír Koník (July 1, 2009–Nov 13, 2009)
  Adrián Guľa (Nov 14, 2009–June 30, 2013)
  Ľubomír Nosický (July 1, 2013–Sept 16, 2013)
  Martin Ševela and Ivan Vrabec (Sept 16, 2013–Dec 31,2015)
  Martin Ševela (2016-)

References

Managers
 
As Trencin
AS Trenčín